Perigea bahamica is a moth in the family Noctuidae. It is found on the Bahamas. The species was collected in Monroe County, Florida, in 2012.

References

Moths described in 1908
Condicinae